Nebraska Highway 105 is a highway in southeastern Nebraska.  Its southern terminus is at an intersection with Nebraska Highway 8 south of Humboldt.  Its northern terminus is at an intersection with Nebraska Highway 67 west of Brock.

Route description
Nebraska Highway 105 begins at an intersection with NE 8 south of Humboldt. It heads in a northbound direction through farmland, turning slightly to the northeast before entering Humboldt. At that point, NE 105 splits and heads directly to the north. It passes by NE 62 east of Elk Creek. Further north, it intersects with US 136 and runs concurrently northward for about a mile. NE 105 continues to the north near Johnson. To the north of Johnson, the highway meets its termination point at NE 67 west of Brock.

Major intersections

References

External links

Nebraska Roads: NE 101-119

105
Transportation in Richardson County, Nebraska
Transportation in Pawnee County, Nebraska
Transportation in Nemaha County, Nebraska